This is a list of all (former) Member of the European Parliament for the Labour Party (PvdA) 
Source:

Seats in the European Parliament

Alphabetical

Delegation members of the European Coal and Steel Community Parliament (from 1952-58)

Delegation members of the European Parliament (1958-79)

Elected members of the European Parliament (from 1979) 
Current members of the European Parliament are in bold.

European Parliament periods

1952-1958 (Delegation members of the European Coal and Steel Community Parliament) 

 Paul Kapteijn
 Marinus van der Goes van Naters
 Gerard Nederhorst

1958-1979 (Delegation to the European Parliament) 

 Wim Albers
 Nel Barendregt
 Jan Broeksz
 Jaap Burger
 Marinus van der Goes van Naters
 Arie van der Hek
 Reint Laan
 Cees Laban
 Jan Lamberts
 Gerard Nederhorst
 Ad Oele
 Schelto Patijn
 Siep Posthumus
 Jan Pronk
 Max van der Stoel
 Henk Vredeling
 Ep Wieldraaijer

1979-1984 
 

9 seats: 
 Wim Albers
 Bob Cohen
 Piet Dankert
 Annie Krouwel-Vlam
 Johan van Minnen
 Hemmo Muntingh
 Anne Vondeling (top candidate) (replaced by: Phili Viehoff)
 Eisso Woltjer
 Ien van den Heuvel-de Blank
 Phili Viehoff

1984-1989 
 

9 seats: 
 Hedy d'Ancona
 Bob Cohen
 Piet Dankert (top candidate)
 Ien van den Heuvel-de Blank
 Alman Metten
 Hemmo Muntingh
 Ben Visser
 Phili Viehoff
 Eisso Woltjer

1989-1994 
 

8 seats: 
 Hedy d'Ancona (replaced by: Mathilde van den Brink)
 Piet Dankert (top candidate) (replaced by: Annemarie Goedmakers)
 Alman Metten
 Hemmo Muntingh
 Maartje van Putten
 Wim van Velzen
 Ben Visser
 Eisso Woltjer
 Mathilde van den Brink
 Annemarie Goedmakers

1994-1999 
 

8 seats: 
 Piet Dankert
 Leonie van Bladel
 Jan Marinus Wiersma
 Frits Castricum
 Hedy d'Ancona (top candidate)
 Wim van Velzen
 Maartje van Putten
 Alman Metten

1999-2004 
 

6 seats: 
 Michiel van Hulten
 Joke Swiebel
 Ieke van den Burg
 Dorette Corbey
 Max van den Berg (top candidate)
 Jan Marinus Wiersma

2004-2009 
 

7 seats:
 Max van den Berg (top candidate) (replaced by: Lily Jacobs)
 Thijs Berman
 Emine Bozkurt
 Ieke van den Burg
 Dorette Corbey
 Edith Mastenbroek (replaced by: Jan Cremers)
 Jan-Marinus Wiersma
 Jan Cremers
 Lily Jacobs

2009-2014 
 

3 seats:
 Thijs Berman (top candidate)
 Emine Bozkurt
 Judith Merkies

2014-2019 
 

3 seats:
 Paul Tang (top candidate)
 Agnes Jongerius
 Kati Piri

2019-2024 
 

6 seats: 
 Agnes Jongerius
 Kati Piri
 Paul Tang
 Vera Tax
 Mohammed Chahim
 Lara Wolters

References

Main